The compensatory root water uptake conductance (Kcomp) characterizes how a plant compensates its water uptake under heterogeneous water potential. 
It controls the root water uptake in a soil where the water potential is not uniform.

See also 
 Standard Uptake Fraction
 Hydraulic conductivity

References 

Plant physiology